Eatoniella albocolumella is a species of marine gastropod mollusc in the family Eatoniellidae. It was first described by Winston Ponder in 1965. It is endemic to the waters of New Zealand.

Description

Eatoniella albocolumella has a variably coloured shell, with many specimens having a dark purple/grey shell. The colouration of the shell varies greatly in populations, between white and uniformly dark. The species measures 2.37 millimetres by 1.35 millimetres.

Eatoniella albocolumella can be told apart from Eatoniella limbata by its thinner shell and strongly reflected outer lip.

Distribution
The species is Endemic to New Zealand. The holotype of the species was collected by W.J. Ballantine in 1964, on coralline algae at Cape Campbell in the Marlborough District of the South Island of New Zealand. Eatoniella albocolumella is one of the most commonly found micromolluscs in the Kawhia Harbour.

The species is often found living on the surface of seaweeds.

References

Eatoniellidae
Gastropods described in 1965
Gastropods of New Zealand
Endemic fauna of New Zealand
Endemic molluscs of New Zealand
Molluscs of the Pacific Ocean
Taxa named by Winston Ponder